Newland Howard Holmes (August 30, 1891 – January 27, 1965) was a Massachusetts politician who served as President of the Massachusetts Senate from 1957 to 1958. As of 2022, he is the last Republican to hold this position.

Early life
Holmes was born in Brockton, Massachusetts on August 30, 1891. He was a descendant of John Holmes, gentleman of Colchester, Essex, Messenger of the General Court of Plymouth Colony and the executioner of Thomas Granger. He was a cousin of John Haynes Holmes.

Career
Holmes was a member of the Massachusetts House of Representatives from five years before moving to the Senate in 1929. He was the Senate Majority Leader from 1955 to 1956.

In 1956, Richard I. Furbush did not run for re-election and Holmes sought to succeed him as Senate President. At the Republican caucus held before the floor vote, Holmes lost to Senator Philip A. Graham fifteen votes to six. However, Holmes chose not to abide by the caucus decision and ran against Graham and Democratic leader John E. Powers for the Senate Presidency.

On the first ballot, Powers received the vote of all nineteen Democrats while the Republican vote was split between Graham (sixteen votes) and Holmes (five votes). Powers preferred Holmes to Graham and after a lengthy caucus with the Democrats, he was able to convince fifteen Democrats to support Holmes. On the second ballot, Holmes won the Presidency with twenty votes to Graham's sixteen and Powers' four.

Holmes remained President until the Republicans lost their majority following the 1958 election. He remained in the Senate until he was defeated by William Weeks, the son of former United States Secretary of Commerce and United States Senator Sinclair Weeks, in 1964. Holmes' thirty-six year tenure in the Massachusetts Senate is the longest in that body's history.

See also
 Massachusetts legislature: 1925–1926, 1927–1928, 1929–1930, 1931–1932, 1935–1936, 1937–1938, 1939, 1941–1942, 1943–1944, 1947–1948, 1949–1950, 1951–1952, 1953–1954, 1955–1956, 1957–1958
 Massachusetts Senate's Norfolk and Plymouth district

References 

1891 births
1965 deaths
Republican Party Massachusetts state senators
Republican Party members of the Massachusetts House of Representatives
People from Weymouth, Massachusetts
Politicians from Brockton, Massachusetts
Presidents of the Massachusetts Senate
20th-century American politicians